The 1911–12 Massachusetts Agricultural College Aggies men's ice hockey season was the 4th season of play for the program.

Season
Mass Ag produced a stellar record for the second consecutive season. The team won most of their games handily, placing themselves at the top of the heap for teams outside the Ivy League.

Roster

Standings

Schedule and Results

|-
!colspan=12 style=";" | Regular Season

† Mass Ag and MIT agreed not to count the game due to the extremely poor condition of the ice.

References

UMass Minutemen ice hockey seasons
Massachusetts Agricultural College
Massachusetts Agricultural College
Massachusetts Agricultural College
Massachusetts Agricultural College